Ivor Parry  (known as Rovi) (29 November 1919 – 8 June 1996) was a Welsh magician. Specializing in card magic, his original creations were published in "Rovi Reveals" as part of the Supreme Magic Teach-in Series by Lewis Ganson. The Rovi Trophy is presented annually for the best card trick at the International Brotherhood of Magicians' British Ring Convention. Parry was born in Caernarfon.

References

External links
 Rovi: The Story Of A Man And His Magic, The Cairn Press, 2000
 'Rovi Reveals', Lewis Ganson, Supreme Magic Publication, 1980
 The Opus Story, Opus Magazine
 Edwin A Dawes and Michael Bailey (eds.), Circle Without End: The Magic Circle 1905 - 2005, Jeremy Mills Publishing, 2005, 

British magicians
People from Caernarfon
1919 births
1996 deaths